Goldsboro is an unincorporated community in Coal Township, Jackson County, Ohio, United States.  It is located west of Wellston on Ohio State Route 93, between Comet and Glen Roy.

References 

Unincorporated communities in Jackson County, Ohio